This is a list of tallest demolished freestanding structures in the world. To be freestanding a structure must not be supported by guy wires, the sea or other types of support. It therefore does not include guyed masts, partially guyed towers and drilling platforms but does include towers, skyscrapers (pinnacle height) and chimneys.

Demolished freestanding structures 198 m/650 ft or taller
Structures with the same height are ordered by demolition date.

Timeline of world's tallest demolished freestanding structures

See also 
 List of tallest structures by country
 List of tallest towers
 List of tallest chimneys
 List of tallest buildings and structures
 Lattice tower

References 

Tallest, demolished